Peter Quirk (born 26 January 1961) is a former Australian rules footballer who played with the Sydney Swans in the Victorian Football League (VFL).

Quirk came from Riverina Football League club Narrandera. He made seven VFL appearances for the Swans, all in the second half of the 1987 season. This included Sydney's round 17 win over Essendon, when they amassed a club record score of 236 points, just two short of then league record He had also played the previous week, when Sydney scored 201 against the West Coast Eagles.
  
He finished third in the 1990 Sydney to Melbourne Ultramarathon.

References

1967 births
Living people
Australian rules footballers from New South Wales
Sydney Swans players
Australian male marathon runners
Australian ultramarathon runners
Male ultramarathon runners